Dillon is a given name.

Notable people with the given name "Dillon" include

A
Dillon Anderson (1906–1974), American politician
Dillon Ashe (1666–1724), English archdeacon

B
Dillon Barna (born 1987), American soccer player
Dillon Barnes (born 1996), English footballer
Dillon Bassett (born 1997), American stock car racing driver
Dillon Bates (born 1988), American politician
Dillon Battistini (born 1977), British racing driver
Dillon Baxter (born 1991), American football player
Dillon Bell (1822–1898), New Zealand politician
Dillon Boucher (born 1975), New Zealand basketball player
Dillon Brooks (born 1996), Canadian basketball player
Dillon Burroughs (born 1976), American author

C
Dillon Carew (born 1970), Guyanese boxer
Dillon Carmichael, American singer
Dillon Casey (born 1983), American-Canadian actor

D
Dillon Day (born 1970), American pornographic actor
Dillon Day (American football) (born 1991), American football player
Dillon De Silva (born 2002), Sri Lankan footballer
Dillon Douglas (born 1988), West Indian cricketer
Dillon Dubé (born 1998), Canadian ice hockey player
Dillon du Preez (born 1981), South African cricketer

F
Dillon Farrell (born 1990), American football player
Dillon Forte (born 1987), American tattoo artist
Dillon Fournier (born 1994), Canadian ice hockey player
Dillon Francis (born 1987), American disc jockey
Dillon Freasier (born 1996), American actor

G
Dillon Gabriel (born 2000), American football player
Dillon Gee (born 1986), American baseball player
Dillon Gordon (born 1993), American football player
Dillon Guy (born 1991), American football player

H
Dillon Heatherington (born 1995), Canadian ice hockey player
Dillon Heyliger (born 1989), Canadian cricketer
Dillon Hunt (born 1995), New Zealand rugby union player

J
Dillon D. Jordan (born 1973), American film producer

L
Dillon Lawson, American baseball coach
Dillon Lewis (born 1996), Welsh rugby union player

M
Dillon Maggard (born 1995), American runner
Dillon Maples (born 1992), American baseball player
Dillon Mitchell (born 1998), American football player
Dillon Mitchell (basketball) (born 2003), American basketball player
Dillon S. Myer (1891–1982), American politician

N
Dillon Naylor (born 1968), Australian cartoonist

O
Dillon Overton (born 1991), American baseball pitcher

P
Dillon Pennington (born 1999), English cricketer
Dillon Peters (born 1992), American baseball player
Dillon Phillips (born 1995), English footballer
Dillon Powers (born 1991), American soccer player

Q
Dillon Quirke (1998–2022), Irish hurler

R
Dillon Radunz (born 1998), American football player
Dillon Ruml (born 1999), American racing driver

S
Dillon Serna (born 1994), American soccer player
Dillon Sheppard (born 1979), South African football player
Dillon Simpson (born 1993), Canadian ice hockey player
Dillon Smit (born 1992), South African rugby union footballer
Dillon Steuer (born 2002), American racing driver
Dillon Stevens (born 1997), American actor
Dillon Stith (born 1992), American basketball player
Dillon Stoner (born 1998), American football player

T
Dillon Tate (born 1994), American baseball player
Dillon Thomas (born 1992), American baseball player

W
Dillon Wallace (1863–1939), American author
Dillon Ward (born 1991), Canadian lacrosse player

See also
Dillon (disambiguation), a disambiguation page for "Dillon"
Dillon (surname), a page for people surnamed "Dillon"
Dylan (name), includes a list of people with the given name or surname

English-language masculine given names